Andrés García (born 1941) is a Mexican actor.

Andrés García may also refer to:

Sportspeople
 Andrés García (fencer) (born 1967), Spanish Olympic fencer
 Andrés García (footballer, born 1984), Spanish football manager and former defender
 Andrés García (footballer, born 1996), Spanish football midfielder
 Andrés García (footballer, born 2003), Spanish football winger

Others
 Andrés García-Peña (born 1961), Colombian-American painter
 Andrés García, Colombian singer in rock band Ekhymosis
 Andrés García La Calle (1909–1980), Spanish squadron leader

See also
Andre Garcia (disambiguation)